Scuola Statale Italiana di Madrid or the Istituto Italiano Statale Comprensivo "Enrico Fermi" is an Italian international school in Madrid, Spain. Owned by the Italian government, it has scuola dell'infanzia, scuola primaria, scuola media, and liceo levels.

References

External links

 Scuola Statale Italiana di Madrid 

Italian international schools in Spain
International schools in Madrid
Educational institutions with year of establishment missing